The Asian American Foundation (TAAF) is an American foundation founded in 2021 by a group of prominent Asian Americans and Pacific Islanders, aiming to support an array of Asian American and Pacific Islander causes and create a national infrastructure for a community that has faced an increasing number of racial attacks. Launched with $250 million, TAAF is described by organizers as the largest-ever philanthropic effort to support the AAPI community in history. The founders include Joe Tsai, Joseph Bae, Li Lu, Peng Zhao, Sheila Lirio Marcelo and Jonathan Greenblatt. Its Founding Advisory Council members include Daniel Dae Kim, Lisa Ling, Condoleezza Rice, Jeremy Lin and more. The organization is presently chaired by Li Lu, hedge fund manager who founded Himalaya Capital Management.

Initiatives 
The funding will go to three focus areas: supporting anti-hate organizations and initiatives, data collection and research to support policy change and education through curriculum development, storytelling, film and the arts.

TAAF's AAPI Giving Challenge funds AAPI communities and causes which develop programs which further TAAF's mission.

References

External links 

 

Asian studies